This is a timeline of the Oirats, also known as the Kalmyks or Dzungars.

13th century

14th century

15th century

16th century

17th century

18th century

Gallery

References

Bibliography

 
Mongol states
Inner Asia
Oirats
Former countries in Chinese history